Prasad Babu is an Indian actor who acts in predominantly Telugu films and also TV serials.

Filmography

 Punadhirallu
 Anthuleni Katha
 Mana Voori Pandavulu (1978)
 I Love You (1979)
 Aarani Mantalu (1980)
 Bobbili Puli (1982)
 Nivuru Gappina Nippu (1982)
 Bangaru Koduku (1982)
 Nijam Chepithe Nerama (1983) as Subbudu
 Jebu Donga (1987)
 Trinetrudu (1988)
 Rudraveena (1988)
 Khaidi No. 786 (1988)
 Yamudiki Mogudu
 Anna Chellelu (1988) as Dr. Giri
Unnal Mudiyum Thambi (Tamil)
Kondaveeti Donga (1990) as Forest Officer
Raja Vikramarka (1990) as Thangavelu
Kodama Simham (1990)
Gang Leader (1991)
Assembly Rowdy (1991)
 Allari Mogudu (1992)
 Ghatotkachudu (1995)
 Pandurangadu
 Jayam Manadera (2000)
Murari (2001)
 Neti Gandhi
Jaatara
 Krishnavataram
 Thiladanam
 Apparao Nelatappadu
 Aadavari Matalaku Arthale Verule
 Dammu (2012)

Television 
Ninne Pelladutha (Gemini TV)
Jayam (ETV)
Chinna Kodalu as Surendra Varma (Zee Telugu)
Ramulamma as Raja (MAA TV)
Bandham (Gemini TV)
Prem nagar(ETV)
Anu Ane Nenu (Gemini TV)

External links
 

Living people
Male actors from Andhra Pradesh
Indian male film actors
Telugu male actors
Place of birth missing (living people)
People from Ongole
1950 births
Male actors in Telugu cinema
Male actors in Tamil cinema
Indian male television actors
Male actors in Telugu television
20th-century Indian male actors